Somnio is a private super yacht being built by Norwegian shipyard VARD. The hull, and the first phase of outfitting, will be performed at Vard Tulcea in Romania. It is considered the world's first "yacht liner" because it contains 39 customizable apartments.  The apartments reportedly cost at least $11.2 million each (about half the net worth of the threshold for a global 0.1%). With six floors, plans for world-class medical care, an onboard beach, several bars, a 10,000-bottle wine cellar, and many restaurants, Somnio offers an exclusive retreat for its owners. 

Membership is by referral or invitation, with members' identity remaining undisclosed.

Winch Design of the United Kingdom and Tillberg Design of Sweden are the architects.

It is expected to launch in mid-2024. Somnio also has advanced research equipment for scientists. It will be the second residential superyacht at sea and in size will be slightly larger than The World, the only residential superyacht currently in existence.

References

External links
Somnio

Individual yachts
Motor yachts
Ships built in Norway
Fincantieri